Jarawa (also known as Jar, Jara, or in Hausa: Jaranci) is the most populous of the Bantu languages of eastern Nigeria. It is a dialect cluster consisting of many varieties.

Dialects
Jarawa dialects are:
 Zhár (Bankal)
 Zugur (Duguri)
 Gwak (Gingwak)
 Ndaŋshi
 Dòòrì
 Mbat (Bada)
 Mùùn
 Kantana
 Dàmùl
Kantana may be a distinct language. 

Blench (2019) lists these varieties as dialects of Jar (Jarawa).

Zhar
Ligri
Kantana
Bobar (?)
Gwak (Gingwak)
Dõõri
Mbat
Mbat-Galamkya

References

Jarawan languages
Languages of Nigeria